Lapstone railway station is located on the Main Western line in New South Wales, Australia. It serves the Blue Mountains village of Lapstone opening on 24 February 1964.

In April 2021 the station was upgraded and received a new lift and platform tactiles.

Platforms & services
Lapstone has two side platforms. It is serviced by NSW TrainLink Blue Mountains Line services travelling from Sydney Central to Lithgow.

References

External links

Lapstone station details Transport for New South Wales

Railway stations in Australia opened in 1964
Regional railway stations in New South Wales
Short-platform railway stations in New South Wales, 6 cars
Main Western railway line, New South Wales